Clinton Bridge and Iron Works was a significant company in Clinton, Iowa.

George Edwin Wilson (b. England, 1847-d. Iowa, 1926) purchased Clinton Bridge & Iron Works, of Clinton, Iowa, in 1892.  According to a history "This company is one of the leading concerns of the state and is too well known to require lengthy description here.  Under Mr. Wilson's able and judicious management it has maintained an envied position in the industrial world.  Its business is constantly increasing."

It designed and/or built numerous bridges, including many that are listed on the National Register of Historic Places.

The Snider Bridge is the oldest truss bridge attributed to Clinton Bridge & Iron Works.

Bellefountain Bridge, Ashland Ave. over Des Moines R. Tracy, IA (Clinton Bridge and Iron Works), NRHP-listed
Berkhimer Bridge, 245th St. over Des Moines R. Humboldt, IA (Clinton Bridge and Iron Works), NRHP-listed
Bridge No. 1, NW of La Crosse La Crosse, WI (Clinton Bridge Company), NRHP-listed
Bridge No. 2, NW of La Crosse La Crosse, WI (Clinton Bridge Company), NRHP-listed
Bridge No. 3, NW of La Crosse La Crosse, WI (Clinton Bridge Company), NRHP-listed
Bridge No. 4, NW of La Crosse La Crosse, WI (Clinton Bridge Company), NRHP-listed
Bridge No. 5, NW of La Crosse La Crosse, WI (Clinton Bridge Company), NRHP-listed
Bridge No. 6, NW of La Crosse La Crosse, WI (Clinton Bridge Company), NRHP-listed
Bridgeport Bridge, Old Quarry Rd. Denmark, IA (Clinton Bridge and Iron Works), NRHP-listed
Chambers Ford Bridge, 385th St. over Iowa R. Chelsea, IA (Clinton Bridge and Iron Works), NRHP-listed
Hawkeye Creek Bridge, Hawkeye Rd. over Hawkeye Cr. Mediapolis, IA (Clinton Bridge & Iron Works), NRHP-listed
Little Sioux River Bridge, 210th Ave. over Little Sioux R. Spencer, IA (Clinton Bridge & Iron Works), NRHP-listed
Okoboji Bridge, 180th Ave. over branch of Little Sioux R. Milford, IA (Clinton Bridge & Iron Works), NRHP-listed
Red Bridge, Co.Rd. S74 over South Skunk R. Monroe, IA (Clinton Bridge and Iron Works), NRHP-listed
Upper Iowa River Bridge, Mays Prairie Rd. over Upper Iowa R. Dorchester, IA (Clinton bridge & Iron works), NRHP-listed

References

External links
Clinton Bridge & Iron Works signs indicating Clinton, Iowa location
Clinton Bridge Co. history is covered in a book, The History of Clinton County, Iowa by Lucius P. Allen

Bridge companies
Construction and civil engineering companies of the United States
Construction and civil engineering companies established in 1885
American companies established in 1885
1885 establishments in Iowa